Murugampalayam is a village near Vaipadi in Perundurai Taluk of Erode district. Administratively under Vaipadi panchayat.

Villages in Erode district